Death Valley Junction, more commonly known as Amargosa (Spanish for "Bitter"), is a tiny Mojave Desert unincorporated community in Inyo County, California, at the intersection of SR 190 and SR 127, in the Amargosa Valley and just east of Death Valley National Park.

Death Valley Junction is home to the Amargosa Opera House and Hotel, where resident Marta Becket staged dance and mime shows from the late 1960s until her last show in February 2012. Becket died in 2017.  The hotel is still operating next to the opera house, but beyond these maintained areas, the town is in a state of disrepair. There is no gas station, and only one restaurant, the Amargosa Cafe. The town is owned by the non-profit Amargosa Opera House Inc.  which runs the Opera House, Hotel, and cafe

East/South East, 27 miles, is Pahrump, Nevada. South on SR127 is the town of Shoshone, California. The closest straight-line distance to the Nevada state line is roughly five miles northeast.

This includes areas for residences and the official federal sanction to use some government lands for traditional ceremonies. In 2017 the tribe constructed a cannabis grow facility on the land.

History

The town was created in 1907 when the Tonopah and Tidewater Railroad was constructed through the Amargosa Valley and a spur from their main line was built to the Lila C. borax mine in the hills to the west.  The town was originally owned by Robert Tubb, who operated a saloon, store, and brothel.  The town first appears on the 1910 Furnace Creek Quandrangle USGS topographic map.

In 1914, the Death Valley Railroad started operating between Ryan, California and Death Valley Junction. It carried borax until 1928, when operations ceased. From 1923 to 1925 the Pacific Coast Borax Company constructed buildings in the town, hiring architect Alexander Hamilton McCulloch to design a Spanish Colonial Revival whistle stop centered at the hotel, theater and office complex building, now known as the Amargosa Opera House and Hotel.

The town began to decline in the mid-20th century. However, in 1967 dancer and actress Marta Becket happened to visit due to an automobile repair. She became enamored with the theater, and with help from benefactors, she leased, then purchased, the hotel and theater complex.

The Death Valley post office opened in 1908 and transferred to Furnace Creek Ranch in 1961. The Amargosa post office opened in 1962, changed its name to Death Valley Junction in 1968.

In 1980 the town was included in the National Register of Historic Places as the "Death Valley Junction Historic District."

When the Death Valley Railroad was established in 1914, it used  of tracks belonging to the Tonopah and Tidewater Railroad east-southeast of Death Valley Junction to Horton.

Telephone history

Local wired telephones were manual telephone service until the 1980s. To reach a phone in Death Valley Junction when the area was under manual service required dialing the operator and asking for "Death Valley Junction, California, Toll Station" (and the one-digit number). Placing an outbound call required lifting the receiver and waiting for an operator. The operator who answered was in Los Angeles (over 150 miles away). Death Valley Junction is now in area codes 442 and 760.

Politics

Notable people
"Shotgun" Kitty Tubb - wife of the original owner of the town, Robert Tubb
Marta Becket - retired actress, dancer, choreographer and painter
Harry Rosenberg - engineer who was instrumental in creating useful alloys of titanium

References

Notes

External links

The town that Zane Grey helped build
The Amargosa Opera House and Hotel
Ghost Towns of Death Valley: Death Valley Junction
LIFE Magazine Apr. 17, 1970

Populated places in the Mojave Desert
Unincorporated communities in Inyo County, California
Amargosa Desert
Death Valley National Park
Tonopah and Tidewater Railroad
Historic districts on the National Register of Historic Places in California
National Register of Historic Places in Inyo County, California
Unincorporated communities in California